The Turbomeca Piméné was a small French turbojet engine produced by Turbomeca in the early 1950s.

First shown at the 1949 Paris Air Show this engine passed official type tests in 1950. A similar, but not directly related, smaller turboshaft, known as the Turbomeca Orédon, drove an alternator and was used as an aircraft auxiliary power unit,

Variants
TR-011 small  turbojet engine, precursor to the Orédon APU.
Piménéenlarged  higher mass flow development of the TR-011 / Orédon.

Applications
EFW N-20
Fouga CM.8
Fouga CM.101R
Fouga CM.88 Gemeaux

Specifications

See also

References
Notes

Bibliography

 Gunston, Bill. World Encyclopedia of Aero Engines. Cambridge, England. Patrick Stephens Limited, 1989.

External links
Minijets website

Pimene
1940s turbojet engines
Mixed-compressor gas turbines